"You Got the Wrong Guy" is a song recorded by Canadian country artist Dean Brody. It was written by Jason Massey, Jesse Lee, and Travis Wood.

Background
Brody remarked that it is "very rare for me to relate so strongly to a song that I didn't write", but the "first time I heard this one I knew it was meant for me." He believed that the song "tells a story that so many of us can relate to." The song is the follow-up to Brody's number-one single "Where'd You Learn How to Do That".

Critical reception
Nanci Dagg of Canadian Beats Media stated that the song shows Brody's "deep-rooted beliefs in standing up for what is right and takes listeners through the all too familiar story of seeing someone you love and care for give their heart to someone who doesn't deserve it."

Charts

References

2022 songs
2022 singles
Dean Brody songs
Songs written by Jesse Lee (singer)
Songs written by Travis Wood (songwriter)
Song recordings produced by Todd Clark